Beatrice d'Este (29 June 1475 – 3 January 1497), was Duchess of Bari and Milan by marriage to Ludovico Sforza (known as "il Moro"). She was one of the most important personalities of the time and, despite her short life, she was a major player in Italian politics. A woman of culture, an important patron, a leader in fashion: alongside her illustrious husband she made Milan one of the greatest capitals of the European Renaissance. With her own determination and bellicose nature, she was the soul of the Milanese resistance against the enemy French during the first of the Italian Wars, when her intervention was able to repel the threats of the Duke of Orléans, who was on the verge of conquering Milan.

Life

Childhood

Birth 

She was born on 29 June 1475 in the Castello Estense of Ferrara, second child of Ercole I d'Este and Eleonora d'Aragona. The Duke of Ferrara longed for a male heir, so her birth was welcomed as a disgrace.

Childhood in Naples (1477-1485) 

Two years later Beatrice was taken to the Aragonese court with her mother and sister on the occasion of the second marriage of King Ferrante with Joan of Aragon. The procession, escorted by Niccolò da Correggio, arrived in Pisa and from there embarked on a galley arriving in Naples on 1 June 1477. On 19 September, Eleonora gave birth to Ferrante and when less than a month later she had to return to Ferrara, she decided to take her eldest daughter Isabella with her, while King Ferrante convinced her to leave both the newborn and Beatrice in Naples, with whom he had immediately shown himself to be in love.

Beatrice thus lived in the Neapolitan city for eight years, entrusted to the care of the nurse Serena and the cultured and virtuous aunt Ippolita Maria Sforza, and grew up between the ducal residence of Castel Capuano, where she lived with her younger brother and with her three cousins, Ferrandino, Pietro and Isabella, and the royal residence of Castel Nuovo, where the king and queen of Naples resided. Ferrante considered it a "same thing" with the infanta Giovannella his daughter, so much so that the Este ambassador wrote in 1479 to her mother Eleonora that the father would also return her son, now that he was older, but not Beatrice, because "his majesty wants to give her in marriage and keep her for himself". Formally adopted by her grandfather, the child in those years came to sign herself simply "donna Beatrice de Aragonia" and learned to express herself in a mixture of Catalan, Castilian and Italian, a habit that she seems not to have preserved as an adult.

Marriage proposals 

 In 1480 the Duke of Bari Ludovico Sforza, known as il Moro, regent of the Duchy of Milan in the name of his nephew Gian Galeazzo, began negotiations with Ercole d'Este to obtain the hand of his eldest daughter Isabella. This was not possible because the child had already been promised to Francesco Gonzaga. Hercules did not want to give up the relationship with the Moro, who was at the time one of the richest and most influential men of the peninsula, so he put forward the proposal of the second daughter Beatrice who, with the consent of King Ferrante, was immediately accepted.  The alliance proved very useful to the Duchy of Ferrara, constantly threatened by Venetian expansionism. 
 In 1484 her aunt Beatrice of Aragon, Queen of Hungary, proposed to her sister Eleonora an exchange: the eldest daughter Isabella would marry the King of Bohemia Ladislaus II (alleged lover, then husband, of the same Beatrice of Aragon), Beatrice Francesco Gonzaga and the Moro another Neapolitan noblewoman. Eleonora replied that this "exchange" was not possible, both because Isabella was loved by the Gonzaga, and because Beatrice was under the absolute power of her grandfather Ferrante. He proposed, however, to deal with Ferrante to secretly betroth Beatrice to Władysław, so as to guarantee her a reserve husband in case Ludovico sought a wife "more in keeping with her age".
 In 1485 the Marquis Boniface III of Monferrato, over sixty years old, widower and without heirs, but still "viripotens", hinted at marrying Beatrice; the proposal was probably not followed, both because of the great age difference (51 years), and because it needed a wife of childbearing age.

Adolescence ferrarese (1485-1490) 

In 1485 Ludovico persuaded his in-laws to return Beatrice to Ferrara, so that she could be educated in a court more suited to her role (the Milanese had in fact a very bad opinion of the Neapolitans) and with the excuse of being able to visit her more easily (which she never did). King Ferrante denied her with "good and living reasons", saying that she was only ten years old, that he had taken her as a daughter and that she was not ready for the wedding. Moreover, if Ludovico had died early, her father would not have been able, like him, to find her a good husband. He even offered to give her the dowry in her place, in order to convince him to desist. Despite the strong protests, he reluctantly had to agree, after months of negotiations, to part with it. Immediately after the departure of his niece, he wrote embittered to his daughter Eleonora: "God knows how much we grieved, for the singular love we had for her virtues [...] that seeing her and having her at home it seemed to us that we had you".

Given the importance of the groom, the parents tried to bring the wedding forward to 1488, but Louis made his father-in-law understand that he was too busy in the affairs of state and that the bride was still too young. The date was set for May 1490 and a dowry of 40,000 ducats was arranged; From May, however, Ludovico postponed to the summer, then canceled for the umpteenth time, disconcerting the dukes of Ferrara who at this point doubted his real will to marry Beatrice. The reason for this behavior was attributed to the well-known relationship that Ludovico had with the beautiful Cecilia Gallerani. To apologize for the constant postponements, in August 1490 he offered the bride a splendid necklace as a gift.

In Milan (1491-1497)

The wedding 
The official nuptials were to have taken place in January 1491 in a double wedding with Beatrice marrying Ludovico and Isabella marrying Francesco at the same time, but the Duke of Bari postponed it more than once. Finally, around a year later, they were wed in a double Sforza-Este wedding: Ludovico married Beatrice, while Beatrice's brother, Alfonso d'Este, married Anna Sforza, the sister of Gian Galeazzo Sforza. Leonardo da Vinci orchestrated the wedding celebration. In Milan Beatrice will have two people dear in particular: the son-in-law Galeazzo Sanseverino, her faithful companion of adventures, and Bianca Giovanna, illegitimate daughter of Ludovico and wife of the aforementioned Galeazzo, at the time of her father's wedding a nine-year-old girl, whom Beatrice immediately loved and wanted with her on every occasion.

Late consummation 
The marriage was immediately declared consummated, in truth it remained secretly blank for over a month. Ludovico in fact, out of respect for the innocence of the bride, did not want to force her, but waited patiently for her to be willing to give herself spontaneously. The Dukes of Ferrara instead pressed to hasten the consummation: only in this way the marriage would be considered valid, vice versa it was subject to annulment, with serious dishonor of the family. Ludovico had opted for a seductive strategy, and combined caresses and kisses with very rich daily gifts.

Despite the efforts made to accustom her to love games, however, Beatrice remained "in superlative ashamed" and still in mid-February Ludovico had not been able to conclude anything: he complained about it with the Este ambassador Giacomo Trotti, saying that he had been forced to vent with Cecilia.  The ambassador in turn reproached Beatrice for her frigidity and invited her to put "so much shame on the other side", by saying that "men want to be well seen and caressed, as is just and honest, by their wives", but without too much success, as she showed herself to him "a little wild".

Not even the continuous pressure exerted by the father on his daughter had any effect, indeed the more the insistences, the more Beatrice dodged her husband. The situation was finally resolved spontaneously shortly after, when in March–April trotti's letters of complaint turned into praise addressed by moro to his wife. Now he declared that he no longer thought of Cecilia, but only of Beatrice, "To whom he wants all his good, and takes great pleasure from her for her customs and good manners", praising her because "she was delighted by nature ... and very pleasant and nevertheless modest".

Duchess of Milan

Birth of Hercules Maximilian 
After a carefree year spent among many amusements, Beatrice found herself expecting a child. On 20 January 1493 Eleonora of Aragon returned to Milan to assist her daughter during childbirth and brought with her from Ferrara comare Frasina, the midwife of the family. Two days later at the Sala del Tesoro in the Rocchetta of the Castello Sforzesco the gifts of the Milanese nobility were exhibited on tables covered with crimson gold velvet, offered to the Moro in view of the imminent birth of his son. Among these were "two beautiful diamonds" worth 18,000 ducats and a beautiful golden cradle, donated by his father-in-law Hercules. On 23 January Beatrice gave birth to her eldest son Hercules Maximilian, baptized after her father Hercules (Ercole), to whom she always had an unconditional love, and later named Maximilian in honour of the Emperor-elect Maximilian I.

Beatrice's primary concern was from that moment to ensure her son the succession to the Duchy of Milan, which, however, legitimately belonged to the son of her cousin Isabella, for whose purpose she persuaded her husband to appoint the little Maximilian as Count of Pavia, a title belonging exclusively to the heir to the duchy. Isabella, understanding the intentions of the spouses, wrote to her father Alfonso a heartfelt request for help. King Ferrante, however, had no intention of starting a war; on the contrary, he declared that he loved both granddaughters in the same way and invited them to prudence, so that the situation remained stable while the king was alive.

Diplomatic mission to Venice 

In May 1493 Ludovico decided to send his wife as his ambassador to Venice, in order to obtain the support of the Serenissima for his legitimacy as Duke of Milan. He thus aimed to test the intentions of the Republic, while concluding the agreements with Emperor Maximilian of Habsburg and granting him in marriage his niece Bianca Maria Sforza, accompanied by a fabulous dowry of 300 000 gold ducats, plus 40 000 in jewels and another 100 000 for the ducal investiture. On the other hand, Beatrice would have exploited her charm, her intelligence and the pomp of her court to impress the Venetians. The couple first passed through Ferrara, where they were greeted festively by the dukes. Isabella d'Este, in order not to disfigure in comparison with her sister, left Ferrara before their arrival to go to Venice in advance. On 25 May Beatrice left for Venice accompanied by her mother Eleonora, her brother Alfonso with his wife Anna Maria and various secretaries and advisers, with a retinue of more than 1 200 people. They sailed first along the Po, then on a dangerously rough sea that aroused many fears among those present, but not in Beatrice, who enjoyed mocking the fearful of the group.

On the morning of May 27, the fleet reached the fort of Malamocco, where it was welcomed by a delegation of patricians. Beatrice then landed at the island of San Clemente, where she found the doge waiting for her in person. He urged her to board the Bucintoro, which headed for the Grand Canal. During the journey she was able to attend the representation on a barge of the dispute between Minerva and Neptune that led to the foundation of Athens. That evening the Duchess and her family stayed at the Fondaco dei Turchi, owned by the Este family. In the following days she was invited to a meeting of the Maggior Consigli, to a sumptuous breakfast at the Doge's Palace, visited the Arsenal, the island of Murano, St. Mark's Basilica and the Treasury.

A curious episode that took place on this occasion is contained in one of her letters to her husband, to whom Beatrice tells how, while walking through Piazza San Marco, some with the excuse of admiring her ruby had lingered too much on her neckline and how she had responded in a shrewd way: "I had a necklace of pearls and a ruby on my chest [...] and there were those who put their eyes almost up to my chest to look at him and I saw so much anxiety I told him we had to come home, since I would have gladly shown it ".

Finally, on May 30, she secretly received in her chamber three oratories deputies from the Signoria and, having let out all her gentlemen and secretaries, she remained alone with them, saying that she wanted everything to remain top secret. She then presented a memorial, given to her by her husband before her departure, with which he communicated, among other things, his practices with the emperor for obtaining the investiture to the Duchy of Milan. Then she showed a second letter from her husband, just arrived from Belriguardo, saying "this is stronger now": with it she announced the firm intention of Charles VIII to carry out the enterprise against the kingdom of Naples and to appoint Ludovico head and conductor of this enterprise. He therefore wished to know the opinion of the Signoria, asking that it be communicated to his wife before his departure from Venice, otherwise to himself when he arrived in Milan. The Venetians replied that what was reported was very serious and limited themselves to vague reassurances. The mission, however, already started with little hope of success, since from the beginning the Republic did not intend to support Ludovico.

First Italian War 
On 25 January 1494, the old king Ferrante died, who already foreshadowed the outbreak of a war that he had tried with all his might to avoid. Once ascended to the throne of Naples, his son Alfonso II did not hesitate to rush to the aid of his daughter Isabella, declaring war on his brother-in-law Ludovico and occupying, as the first sign of hostility, the city of Bari. Ludovico responded to the threats by leaving the green light to King Charles VIII of France to go down to Italy to conquer the kingdom of Naples, which he believed to be right, having been taken from the Aragonese from the Anjou.

Gallant receptions 

On 23 July 1494 she welcomed duke Louis of Orléans, cousin of the King of France, to Milan, who arrived in Italy with the avant-gardes of the army French, then, on 11 September of the same year, went to Asti to meet Charles VIII in person. The two were greeted with great riots and parties, and both claimed, according to the custom French, to kiss the duchess and all the beautiful bridesmaids of her retie on the mouth.

This custom of "kiss and touch" the women of others initially aroused some annoyance in the Italians, who never willingly got used to it. Moreover, as Baldassarre Castiglione would also say years later, Louis of Orleans used to look a little too mischievously at women, "who are said to like them very much". Nevertheless, Beatrice, through Ambassador Capilupi, also invited her sister to come and kiss Count Gilbert of Bourbon and others who would soon arrive.

King Charles, in particular, was greatly fascinated: he wanted to see her dance and requested a portrait of her, personally taking care of procuring the painter (Jean Perréal) and about twenty clothes to see which one was better worn by Beatrice, who was "more beautiful than ever". The relations between the Duchess and Louis of Orleans were also extremely gallant at the beginning, and the two frequently exchanged gifts with affectionate cards.

Ludovico was not jealous of her: different was the case of the handsome baron of Beauvau, much loved by women, who showed excessive "enthusiasm" towards Beatrice. According to some historians, it was for this reason that Ludovico, offended by the assiduity of the knight, took advantage of an illness of King Charles to remove his wife from Asti, who in fact retired to Annone, while he continued alone to go to Asti every day. A Beauvau actually participated in the enterprise of Naples, but his identity is not clear: currently it is more plausible the identification with Bertrand de Beauvau, son of Antoine, created count of Policastro and died in 1495.

The ducal investiture 
Soon, realizing that his plans had not gone as planned, Ludovico abandoned the alliance with the French and joined the Holy League, expressly formed between the various Italian powers to drive foreigners from the peninsula. Meanwhile, on October 21, 1494, the legitimate Duke Gian Galeazzo died and Ludovico obtained by acclamation of the senate that the ducal title passed to him and his legitimate descendants, thus bypassing in the succession the son that Gian Galeazzo left.

Beatrice, who was pregnant at that time, gave birth on February 4, 1495, Sforza Francesco, so named in honor of his late paternal uncle Sforza Maria, to whom Ludovico had been very fond, and of his grandfather Francesco. The newborn was baptized by his aunt Isabella d'Este with fifteen names, but was then called simply Francesco.

The official investiture by the emperor came on May 26, 1495, and was solemnized by a large public ceremony in the Duomo.

The siege of Novara 

Soon, realizing that his plans had not gone as planned, Ludovico abandoned the alliance with the French and joined the Holy League, expressly formed among the various Italian powers to drive foreigners from the peninsula. While Charles, after the conquest of Naples, was still in the kingdom, in a situation of serious tension, on 11 June 1495, contravening the orders of the king, Louis of Orléans occupied the city of Novara with his men and went as far as Vigevano, threatening concretely to attack Milan with the intention of usurping the duchy, which he considered his right being a descendant of Valentina Visconti.

Ludovico hastened to close himself with his wife and children in the Rocca del Castello in Milan but, not feeling equally safe, he contemplated leaving the duchy to take refuge in Spain. Only the iron opposition of his wife and some members of the council, as Bernardino Corio writes, convinced him to desist from this idea. 
However, due to the heavy expenses incurred for the investiture, the state was on the verge of financial collapse, and there was no money to maintain the army; a popular uprising was feared. The Commines writes that, if the Duke of Orleans had advanced only a hundred steps, the Milanese army would have passed the Ticino, and he would have managed to enter Milan, since some noble citizens had offered to introduce it.

Ludovico did not resist the tension and was struck, it seems, by a stroke that left him paralyzed for a short time. "The Duke of Milan has lost his feelings," Malipiero writes, "he abandons himself." Beatrice therefore found herself alone to face the difficult situation of war. However, he managed to juggle very well and to ensure the support and loyalty of the Milanese nobles. It was then that her husband officially appointed her governor of Milan together with her brother Alfonso, who soon came to their rescue. The latter, however, soon fell ill with syphilis, also it was rumored that Duke Ercole did not want the recovery of Novara, being in league with the French, and together with the Florentines secretly subveded the Orleans, and that , stronghold of the Sforza army, played a double game with the king of France.

Beatrice therefore decided, on June 27, to go alone to the military camp of Vigevano to supervise the order and animate the captains against the French, despite the fact that the Duke of Orleans made raids in that area all day long, while her husband remained in Milan. On this occasion she demonstrated – not unlike her male relatives – a remarkable inclination to war. This is considerable when one considers that the conduct of war operations was at that time the prerogative of men. More than the kinship with her father, whose help she asked for help in vain, the alliance with Venice proved fruitful, which sent Bernardo Contarini, provveditore of the stratioti, to the rescue, with whom Beatrice became friends. Some severed heads of the French were brought to her by the stratioti, and she rewarded them with a ducat for each.

Guicciardini's opinion is that if Louis d'Orléans had attempted the assault immediately, he would have taken Milan since the defence was inconsistent, but Beatrice's demonstration of strength was perhaps worth confusing him in making him believe the defences superior to what they were so that he did not dare to try his luck and retreated into Novara. The hesitation was fatal to him, as it allowed the army to reorganize and surround him, thus forcing him to a long and exhausting siege that decimated his men due to famine and epidemics, a siege from which he was finally defeated a few months later on the imposition of King Charles who returned to France.

In early August, finally healed, Ludovico went with his wife to the Camp of Novara, where they resided for a few weeks during the siege. On the occasion of their visit was held, for the pleasure of the duchess who greatly appreciated the facts of arms, a memorable parade of the army in full. Beatrice's presence did not have to garbare much to the Marquis of Mantua her brother-in-law, then captain general of the League, if at some point he invited not too kindly Ludovico to lock his wife "in coffers".

Since the Germans wanted to make "cruel revenge" against the Italians, Ludovico begged Francesco to save Beatrice, fearing that she would be raped or killed. The marquis with an intrepid spirit rode among the Germans and not without great effort managed to mediate peace. "Understanding success, Ludovico became the happiest man in the world, seeming to him that he had recovered the State and his life, and together with honor his wife, for whose safety he feared more than for everything else".

Beatrice personally participated in the council of war, as well as in the peace negotiations, as well as having participated in all the meetings held previously with the French, who did not fail to be amazed to see her actively collaborating alongside her husband.

After the Battle of Fornovo (1495), both he and his wife took part in the peace congress of Vercelli between Charles VIII of France and the Italian princes, at which Beatrice showed great political ability.

In the summer of 1496 Beatrice and the Moor met Maximilian I of Habsburg in Malles. The emperor was particularly kind to the Duchess, going so far as to personally cut the dishes on her plate, and wanted her to sit in the middle between himself and the duke. Sanuto then notes that "a contemplation di la duchessa de Milano", that is, by the will of her, or rather by the desire to see her again, Maximilian passed "that mountain so harsh" and in a completely informal way, without any pomp, came to Como, then stayed for some time in Vigevano in strictly friendly relations with the dukes. He probably admired it for its hunting skills and tenacious character, but his visit also had a political purpose: to urge the emperor to the enterprise of Pisa in an anti-French function.

Death 
In recent months, however, relations between the two spouses had become very worn out due to the adulterous relationship that Ludovico had with Lucrezia Crivelli, his wife's lady-in-waiting. Despite the bad moods, Beatrice found herself pregnant for the third time, but the pregnancy was complicated both by the sorrows caused by the discovery that Lucrezia was also expecting a child from Ludovico, something for which she felt deeply humiliated, and by the premature and tragic death of the beloved Bianca Giovanna, Ludovico's illegitimate daughter and her dear friend from the first day of arrival in Milan. The birth finally took place on the night between 2 and 3 January 1497, but neither the mother nor the son survived.

In a letter written hours after her death, Ludovico informed his brother-in-law Francesco Gonzaga that his wife, "gave back her spirit to God" half an hour after midnight. Their child had been born at eleven at night and was a stillborn son. Ludovico went mad with pain and for two weeks remained locked up in the dark in his apartments, after which he shaved his head and let his beard grow, wearing from that moment on only black clothes with a torn cloak of a beggar. His only concern became the embellishment of the family mausoleum and the neglected state fell into disrepair.

With these few words on that same night he announced the departure of his wife to the Marquis of Mantua Francesco Gonzaga, husband of his sister-in-law Isabella:]
He told the Ferrarese ambassador that "he never thought he could ever tolerate such a bitter plague", and that he had had him summoned to report to Duke Ercole that if what had ever offended her, as he knew he had done, he asks forgiveness from your ex. your and her, finding himself discontented to the soul ", since" in every prayer he had always prayed to our Lord God that she left after him, as the one in whom he had assumed all his rest, and since God did not like it, he prayed to him and would always pray to him continually, that if it is ever possible for a living person to see a dead, grant him the grace that he may see her and speak to her one last time, as the one he loved more than himself ".

Even the Sanuto writes that "Whose death the duke could not bear for the great love that brought her, and said that he no longer wanted to take care of either his children, or the state, or worldly things, and just wanted to live [...] and since then this duke began to feel great troubles, while before he had always lived happily".

The Emperor Maximilian, in condoning with the Moro, wrote that "nothing heavier or more annoying could happen to us at this time, than to be so suddenly deprived of a joint among the other princesses dear to us, after the beginning more abundant familiarity of his virtues, and that you in truth, who are primarily loved by us, have been deprived not only of a sweet consort, but of an ally of your principality, of the relief from your troubles and occupations. [...] Your most happy consort did not lack any virtue or luck or body or soul that could be desired by anyone; no dignity, no merit that could be added".

She was buried in the choir of the church of Santa Maria delle Grazie in Milan. The duke commissioned a funeral monument for himself and his wife to Cristoforo Solari, but following his death in captivity in France, he was transferred, empty, to the Certosa di Pavia where he still stands today.

In 1499 Louis d'Orléans returned a second time to claim the Duchy of Milan and, since there was no longer the proud Beatrice to face him, he had an easy game on the dejected Moro, who after an escape and a brief return ended his days as a prisoner in France.

The burial 
After an impressive funeral, during which it was said that Ludovico remarried her as if she were alive, Beatrice was buried in the choir of the church of Santa Maria delle Grazie. The duke commissioned Cristoforo Solari to create a magnificent funeral monument with their two recumbent figures carved in marble, but, due to the French conquest of the duchy, it remained unfinished. Following the provisions of the Council of Trent on burials (1564), it was broken up and largely dispersed. Only the lid with the funeral statues, for the mercy of the Carthusian monks, was saved, and purchased for the small sum of 38 scudi it was transferred empty to the Certosa di Pavia, where it is still today.

Appearance and personality

Physical aspect 
The portraits that remain of her and the descriptions of those who knew her give us the image of a curvaceous young woman, pleasant, with a small nose and slightly turned upwards, full cheeks typical of the Aragonese, short and round chin, dark eyes and long brown hair down to the waist that she always kept wrapped in a coazzone, with a few strands left to fall on the cheeks, a costume that she had already assumed during her childhood in Naples by the will of her ancestor Ferrante, who made her approach and dress in the Castilian manner.

Francesco Muralto presents she as "at a young age, beautiful and of raven colors". We know that she was of short stature and therefore used to wear tiles to reduce the difference in height with her husband, over one meter and eighty meters tall. In the International Footwear Museum of Vigevano there is also a pianella dating back to the late fifteenth century attributed to the Duchess which, considering the size, must have had 34–35 feet.

Personality 
Thanks to her young age, Beatrice was of a happy, cheerful, carefree, playful character, but, not unlike all her brothers, she was also unreflective, violent, impulsive and easily let herself be carried away by anger. Proof of this are many episodes of the Milanese period, including a famous one that happened in April 1491 when, going with some of her ladies to the market disguised as a commoner, she was surprised by a downpour, and while returning to the castle she squabbled on the street with certain commoners who had insulted her because of the clothes with which she and the ladies had sheltered their heads from the rain, not being customary in Milan to dress in that way. On another occasion, realizing that Ludovico wanted to make her wear a dress that he had sewed the same for Gallerani, she made a scene and demanded that Cecilia not wear it.

Proud and obstinate, despite being the least loved daughter, she was the one who most resembled her father by nature. The buffoon Frittella judged that no one should mourn her death, as she was proud and of "feline instincts".  This contrasts with the judgment of Bernardino Zambotti, who says she was "a pleasant person, vertuous and much loved by all peoples, most liberal towards her servants". "The kindest lady in Italy",  a contemporary calls she.

, her faithful and affectionate secretary, praised her ingenuity, affability, grace, liberality, exalted her court of gentlemen, musicians and poets. She was certainly a lover of luxury so much so that the only wardrobe in her rooms at the castle of Pavia contained 84 dresses as well as countless other valuables.

The pranks 
In any case, the court of Milan was a court that loved pranks and Beatrice in particular, having evidently inherited cruelty from her Aragonese relatives, liked heavy ones, if Ludovico writes that one morning she had fun with her cousin Isabella to throw her ladies off her horse. Once again they played the fight and Beatrice threw her cousin to the ground. The most terrible jokes, however, were all against the serious Este ambassador , at the time seventy years old, who found himself several times the house invaded by "large quantities of foxes, wolves and wild cats", that Ludovico bought from certain villani vigevanesi and that Beatrice, having realized how much similar beasts were in "great hatred and annoyance" to the ambassador, made him throw into the house as much as she could by means of waiters and staffers who resorted to the most unthinkable expedients.

Since the ambassador was also quite stingy, Beatrice even went so far as once to rob him of what he was wearing, however for a good cause: while in fact Ludovico held him still by the arms, she took away two golden ducats from the scarsella, the silk hat and the new oltremontano cloth cloak, then gave the two ducats to Trotti's niece, who evidently had to find it in need. The ambassador continually complained to the duchess's father, saying: "and these are my earnings, since I have the damage and insults, as well as I should waste time writing them!"

Nevertheless, Beatrice had limits and never reached the cynicism of her grandfather Ferrante. In fact, when Isabella of Aragon was widowed by her husband Gian Galeazzo, who became aware of the fact that her cousin, although pregnant, remained for the whole time locked up in the dark rooms of the castle of Pavia, forcing even her young children to dress the mourning and to suffer with her, Beatrice had great compassion and insisted that she come to Milan and improve the conditions of the children.

The fraternal bond 
With her brothers she always maintained excellent relations, especially she showed affection towards Ferrante, with whom she had grown up in Naples, and towards Alfonso, who came several times to visit her in Milan. With her sister Isabella the relationship was already more complicated because, although the two felt a sincere affection for each other, for a certain period they moved away because of the envy of Isabella, who already from the very day of the wedding began to nourish mixed feelings towards Beatrice, to whom she envied both the lucky marriage, both the enormous wealth, and, above all, the two sons in perfect health born a short distance from each other, while she tried for years in vain to procreate an heir to her husband Francesco. However, over time the envy subsided, and then dissolved completely at the premature death of her sister, an event for which Isabella showed a deep and sincere pain.

The two sisters were however very different, although sharing the same ambitions, in fact unlike Isabella, who nuded resentment towards her daughters for being born females and poured the blame on her husband Francesco (who was instead very proud of his daughters), Beatrice was, despite her young age, a wife and an exemplary mother, loved her children very much and dedicated to them many attentions of which are witnesses the tender letters sent to her mother Eleonora in which she described the good health and growth of the little Ercole.

Passions 
Just like the grandfather Ferrante, Beatrice loved animals very much and her husband often gave them to her: among the many there are numerous horses, dogs, cats, foxes, wolves, a monkey and even sorcetti, also at the park of the castle of Milan there was a menagerie with numerous species of exotic animals. Nevertheless, Beatrice appreciated hunting just as much, especially that with the falcon, and was an excellent horseman: the French marveled to see her riding "all straight, no more and no less than a man would be". This leads us to believe that she used to mount like a man, contrary to the custom of the time which required women to proceed with both legs on one side.

She showed above all on these occasions to possess a swaggering and reckless character, so much so as to put her life in danger more than once, as when in the summer of 1491 during a hunting trip her mount was hit by a runaway deer. Ludovico tells, not without a certain admiration, that her horse impennò high "how much is a good spear ", but that Beatrice held firmly on the saddle and that when they managed to reach her they found her that "laughed and did not have a fear in the world". The deer with the horns had touched her leg but Ludovico specifies that his wife did not get hurt.

In the same way in the following year, while pregnant with her eldest son, Beatrice threw herself to the assault of an angry boar that had already wounded some greyhounds and first hit him. The hunting fatigues had to, however, on that occasion yield her a new attack of malarial fevers that had already affected her the previous year and that this time made the central months of pregnancy difficult, although without damaging the unborn child or complicating the birth. She also knew how to shoot "admirably" crossbow, in fact in 1493 he killed a wild boar with it after having inflicted five wounds on him.

Although very religious, Beatrice was not austere with regard to carnal matters: she knew well that wars are not won only with weapons and for this reason some of the bridesmaids of her retin had the task of sexually entertaining the sovereigns and foreign dignitaries guests of the court. It is in fact not without a certain surprise that historians remember how, when in 1495 she was at the camp of Novara, Beatrice did not hesitate to offer to personally procure to her brother-in-law Francesco Gonzaga, captain general of the League, a woman with which to celebrate the victory, officially to preserve him and her sister Isabella from the terrible Malfrancese who at that time devastated the peninsula, or perhaps to win his sympathies, as she wished to receive on loan from the Marquis the treasure that he had seized from the tent of Charles VIII following the battle of Fornovo, when the camp French had been looted, treasure of which the most interesting object was an album containing the licentious portraits of all the mistresses of the king of France.

She liked gambling and was able to win the extraordinary sum of 3000 ducats in a single day.  She particularly loved to dance, an art in which she excelled with singular grace: Muralto says she was able to spend the whole night uninterruptedly in dances, and the French marveled that she knew how to dance perfectly according to the fashion of France, despite saying that it was the first time.

However, she was quite modest as far as her own person was concerned, in fact she entrusted herself to the services of a single midwife, comare Frasina da Ferrara, who had introduced her mother and that Beatrice demanded that she come to assist her in Milan even during her third birth, despite the fact that the woman was sick at that time and despite the fact that her father had suggested another equally talented midwife from Ferrara. There were many insistences of the duchess and the people mobilized, who in the end comare Frasina set off on a mule to reach Milan in time.

Political role

The "damnatio memoriae" 

Celebrated by nineteenth-century historians as a sort of romantic heroine, the figure of Beatrice underwent an eclipse during the twentieth century, crushed under the weight of the praise paid to her longest-lived sister Isabella. Although a superficial analysis of historical events has led modern scholars to say that Beatrice had no voice in the politics of the duchy, or even had no interest in it, almost all previous historians agree instead in judging her as the true mastermind behind many of her husband's actions and decisions, over whom she exercised enormous influence, to such an extent that it links her presence to the prosperity and integrity of the entire Sforza state:

She owned in all respects the lands of Cassolnovo, Carlotta, Monte Imperiale, Villanova, Sartirana, Leale, Cusago, Valenza, Galliate, Mortara, Bassignana, San Secondo, Felino, Torrechiara, Castel San Giovanni, Pigliola, Valle di Lugano, as well as the Sforzesca and the park of the castle of Pavia, that her husband had given her, with all the relative possessions, fortresses and feudal rights connected to them, that is the mero et mixto imperio, any type of jurisdiction, gifts, immunities, etc., the faculty to administer them according to one's own will, to delegate castellans, praetors, officers, etc., as well as to benefit from the very rich rents.

As early as January 1492 Ludovico showed his intention to make her sole governor of the state during her absences, and that every day the council was held and the acts of government read in her room. Moreover, both the diplomatic mission to Venice, her constant presence in the councils of war and in meetings with the French, and, above all, her decisive stance in the excited days when Orleans threatened Milan, in stark contrast this time to her husband's intentions to escape,  as well as the actual drift of the Sforza state following his death, they show that his decision-making and political power was much more substantial than is currently thought.

Political Thought 
She initially pursued the policy of her father Ercole, who for years had been plotting to replace Ludovico to Gian Galeazzo in the actual possession of the duchy of Milan and who with this precise purpose had given her to him in marriage. It is to be believed that without the interference of his wife Ludovico would never have taken the step of usurping the duchy to his nephew in all respects and that he would have been content to continue to govern him as regent as he had been doing for more than ten years. It is no coincidence that it was Beatrice herself who said that, with the birth of the little Ercole Massimiliano, she had given birth to a son to her husband and also to her father.

When then, with the change of alliances, Hercules, although officially neutral, continued to lean towards the French, while Louis sided with the Holy League, Beatrice felt betrayed by her father who, in a moment of maximum difficulty, that is, in the days immediately preceding the occupation of Novara by Orléans, did not want to send them the requested aid. She then abandoned her daughter's robes to assume that of head of state, with a letter that for its exceptionally harsh and authoritative tone arouses amazement: she wrote to her father that she would have expected, in such a situation, that he himself would come to their defense, and that he does not understand how he did not want to send even two hundred men of arms, worrying what would have been said in Italy when it had been known about this refusal; therefore she invites him to remedy this lack so as not to leave in her and in her husband the ill will towards her, all the more so since, if he were to be attacked, two hundred men of arms would not be enough for him to defend Ferrara without external help.

Perhaps also as a result of this, after Novara his attitude became more distinctly pro-Venetian. She also carried out an important work of mediation between her husband and the various leaders on the one hand – who resorted to her, as in the case of Fracasso, to obtain favors – and between her husband and the Italian lords on the other. The few surviving letters show her participating in all her husband's secrets, and her correspondence with Francesco Gonzaga is also remarkable.

According to the testimony of Sanudo, it was Beatrice who urged the coming to Italy of Emperor Maximilian in 1496, so that he would take part in the enterprise of Pisa against the Florentines, allies of the French. Since her death the Faenza people were very upset, judging that Astorre Manfredi would have lost the favor of Milan: Faenza, pro-Venetian, was an enemy of Forlì, pro-Florentine, of which was countess Caterina Sforza, nephew of Ludovico. Beatrice must have persuaded her husband to extend her protection to Faenza and it was feared, with his death, a reversal of alliances, which then in fact happened with the war of Pisa, when Ludovico abandoned the ally Venice for Florence, a move that then marked his ruin. Malipiero rejoiced instead, saying: "and with this death will cease so much intelligentness that son-in-law and father-in-law had together".

In Beatrice, moreover, Ludovico had placed all his hopes for the succession and for the maintenance of the state during the minority of the children, since he had always been convinced that he would die before her."And true, the death of Beatrice, the superb and intelligent Ferrarese, was a serious disaster for Ludovico il Moro. She was the soul of all his undertakings, she was the true queen of his heart and his court [...]. If the Duke of Bari [...] managed to represent on the theater of Europe a scene of much superior, as was observed, to his condition, it is largely due to this woman, vain feminally, if you will, and cruel, especially with the Duchess Isabella, but of resolute and tenacious character, of ready ingenuity, of soul open to all the seductions of luxury and to all the attractions of art. When it [...] failed [...] it was like a great storm that came to upset the soul of Ludovico. Nor did he ever recover from it; that death was the beginning of his misfortunes. Gloomy premonitions crossed his mind; it seemed to him that he had remained alone in a great stormy sea and inclined, fearfully, to asceticism. [...] the ghost of his beautiful and poor dead man was always before his spirit."

(Rodolfo Renier, Gaspare Visconti)

The ancient authors 

It was the contemporary historians on the other hand, unlike the modern ones, to recognize its importance: in addition to Sanuto, who writes of her that although "five months pregnant" wherever her husband went "for everything she followed him", Guicciardini also notes that Beatrice was "assiduously companion" to her husband "no less in the important things than in the pleasant ones". But if Sanudo merely shows it to us on the battlefield while supervising the troops, Alessandro Salvago clearly attributes to her the merit of having saved the state from Orléans. Even an illustrious and powerful figure such as Emperor Maximilian I called her principatus socia of her husband, that is, as the one who shared the government with the Moro.

Paolo Giovio, on the other hand, paints an entirely negative picture of it, blaming Beatrice – traditionally attributed to Ludovico – for having called the French to Italy, although he is the only author to speak of it in these terms:

All the opposite her secretary, Vincenzo Calmeta judges the behavior worthy of praise, not of reproach, when he writes of her:
Not unlike Baldassarre Castiglione remembered her, many years later, with a few but significant words in his Cortegiano: "it still hurts me that you all have not met the Duchess Beatrice of Milan [...], so that you will never again have to marvel at the ingenuity of a woman".

Ludovico Ariosto went even further, unifying Beatrice's fate with those of her husband and of the whole of Italy:

Bernardino Corio even claims that already at the age of thirteen, even before arriving in Milan, Beatrice together with her father Ercole had urged Ludovico to reduce entirely in his own hands the government of the city, however her real influence in that period is difficult to prove. Nevertheless, already at the time of her stay in Naples, and therefore in a still puerile age, she proved to be such as to induce Count Diomedes Carafa to write to her father: "of her I predict that she will be a woman of great spirit and able to command ".

Modern authors 
Even in the nineteenth century there are sporadic mentions of it in the works of authors almost always little known: Ludovico Antonio Muratori says she "princess for beauty, and for high ingenuity, worthy of greater life"; Luzio and Renier called her "the soul of all the exploits and delights of her husband"; Francesco Antonio Bianchini calls her "a woman of high feeling and of a manly soul", Anton Domenico Rossi "of soul more than manly"; Goffredo Casalis "woman of lively spirits and rare sense"; Samuele Romanin "princess of great talent and perspicacity, and although young, very knowledgeable of state affairs", and elsewhere: "poured into the things of state, more than not the women [...] she dominated her husband irresistibly, she was his adviser and excitator, and was seen later on the field of Novara raising his downed courage".

Jean de Préchac add that she "had a great influence on the will of Ludovico: she was the only confidant and the ruler of his thoughts. The immature of her death [...] spread the days of Lodovico with bitterness; he had but disasters and ruins"; Raffaele Altavilla writes that Ludovico "used to draw every vigor of mind from the provident and strong advice of his bride", and Pier Ambrogio Curti that "our duke lacked the most effective advice, the soul of his enterprises, with the death of the unsead Beatrice d'Este, whom dominated him at her own will, and to whom he publicly flaunted an extraordinary affection, and from that hour he no longer had his propitious luck". Antonio Locatelli disagrees with many praises, saying that she "had only wickedness as a woman".

Marital bond

Love 
Ludovico, on the other hand, was sincerely in love with his wife, although he continued to have lovers even after the wedding, like most of the lords of the time. In a letter he writes of her: "she is more dear to me than the light of the sun". The harmony of the couple is confirmed by the courtiers, who saw him constantly turn caresses and kisses to his wife: "S.r Ludovico hardly ever takes his eyes off the Duchess of Bari" wrote tebaldo Tebaldi in August 1492; and already a short time after the wedding Galeazzo Visconti declared: "there is such a love between them that I don't think two people can love each other more".

On the other hand, Malaguzzi Valeri notes that if it is true that the love shown by Ludovico should not be nourished by any doubt, however, the extent and the real nature of the feeling with which his wife reciprocated him remains uncertain. Undoubtedly, even if at the beginning Beatrice showed herself reluctant, her husband still managed in a short time to conquer her with his generosity, affability and liberality, but above all with the very rich gifts that in the early days he brought her almost every day, so much so that already a few months after the wedding Beatrice wrote a series of letters to her father, all to thank him that he had deigned to "place me with this illustrious Lord my consort" who "who does not leave me in desire for anything that can bring me honor or pleasure", and still adds: "I am completely obliged to your lordship, because she is the cause of all the good I have". What transpires from the correspondence of that period is therefore a very young Beatrice dazzled by the wealth and importance of her husband, who was then one of the most powerful men on the peninsula, endowed with considerable charm and who did not yet show the weaknesses and contradictions of recent years.

Beyond the real feelings, the two were able to build the image of a close-knit couple united by a love that goes far beyond death, an aspect that struck all contemporaries.

Loyalty 
Unlike his relatives and his sister Isabella, with whom Ludovico himself claimed years later to have had a secret relationship, Beatrice never fell back even the slightest suspicion of adultery. She always maintained a reputation of absolutely honesty, and this in spite of the freedoms in dressing and relating to men: the courtships of chivalrous mold entertained with the French and with the emperor are striking, where in fact the fulfillment of the sexual act was delegated to special courtesans. Precisely because he trusted her blindly, Ludovico granted her enormous freedom, and the only hint of her jealousies refers to the Baron of Beauvau.

Only Achille Dina, a twentieth-century historian, insinuates - but without any evidence - of an affair between her and Galeazzo Sanseverino, arguing that "some intimate remorse" was due to Beatrice's deep sorrow for the death of her stepdaughter: "perhaps his conduct towards Isabella? or something in her relations with Bianca's husband, the charming Galeazzo Sanseverino, whose intrinsic and continuous commonality of pleasures with her cannot fail to strike?"

Beatrice, on the other hand, was aware of her husband's extramarital affairs, but did not give them weight because she knew they were passing distractions. The balance was drastically upset with the appearance of Lucrezia Crivelli in the ranks of the mistresses, as Beatrice had to realize that this time Ludovico had seriously fallen in love and that he had begun to dedicate to the new lover all the care and attention that he once dedicated to her. Muralto specifies that Beatrice "was honored with the greatest care by Ludovico, even though he took Lucrezia Crivelli as his concubine; because of which, although the thing gnawed at the entrails of his wife, love nevertheless did not depart from her".

Beatrice fashion leader 
Beatrice is now known above all for her inventive genius in creating new clothes, which were one of her greatest passions. As long as she lived she had no rivals in any court, she dictated fashion in many cities of the time and it was following her example that numerous Italian noblewomen, even outside the Milanese court, adopted the coazzone hairstyle, which came very much into vogue.

Francesco Muralto remembers her as "inventor of new clothes", role of which she herself shows full awareness when, in a letter to her sister, she apologizes for having "little imagination to make new inventions" at that time, because of the pain for the loss of her mother. Thanks to the correspondence of the ubiquitous Trotti and the letters of Beatrice herself to her sister and husband, many descriptions of her rich clothes and inventions are preserved. An absolute novelty were, for example, striped dresses like the one she wears in the Pala Sforzesca and hers would also seem to be the idea of highlighting the waist by tightening around it a cord of large pearls that she defined in St. Francis style. The pearls of the rest were her greatest habit and since childhood she made constant use of them, both in the form of a necklace, both in hairstyles, and as a decoration of clothes. She preferred deep, square-shaped necklines and fabrics decorated with Sforza and Este exploits, especially with the motif of the Vincian knots designed by Leonardo da Vinci. She sometimes wore hats jeweled with magpie feather and more extravagant uses are also known, such as the solid gold chain that she would seem to wear in the bust carved on the Portal of the room of the sink of the Certosa di Pavia, which was of exclusively male use.

Her taste in dress particularly struck the French courtiers following Charles VIII, who spent themselves in extensive descriptions; the poet André de la Vigne, in his work in verse Le Vergier d'honneur, remembers his excessive ostentatious luxury:

Patronage 
Beatrice d'Este belonged to the best class of Renaissance women, and was one of the cultural influences of the age; to a great extent, her patronage and good taste are responsible for the splendour of the Castello Sforzesco in Milan, the Certosa of Pavia, and many other famous buildings in Lombardy.

Beatrice was mainly interested in poetry and gathered around her an excellent circle of poets in the vernacular, which included, among others, Vincenzo Calmeta, Gaspare Visconti, Niccolò da Correggio, Bernardo Bellincioni, Antonio Cammelli and Serafino Aquilano. According to some, this is a sign of the fact that she did not master Latin, although she had as a tutor the humanist Battista Guarino, in any case she favored the affirmation of vulgar literature in Milan.

Music was a family passion, and therefore in her travels she was always accompanied by musicians and singers. She was a player of viola, lute and clavichord, and learned dance and singing from Ambrogio da Urbino and Lorenzo Lavagnolo.

She left an epistolary of at least four hundred surviving letters, which out of habit she almost always wrote by his own hand and not by means of secretaries, as was customary at the time. Many were lost or destroyed, especially in relation to 1496, perhaps as a result of the high political content, but some appear notable for their exquisite descriptions or burlesque and irreverent tone.

She appreciated the Latin and Greek comedies and tragedies, but above all the Provençal chivalric poems and the Carolingian cycle, which in those years Matteo Maria Boiardo kept alive. She especially loved to listen to the commentary on the Divine Comedy held for her by Antonio Grifo, a passion also shared by her husband who often stopped to listen to her readings.

She used her position as a lady of one of the most splendid courts in Italy to surround herself with men of culture and exceptional artists. Her court was frequented by painters such as Leonardo da Vinci, Ambrogio de Predis, Giovanni Antonio Boltraffio, Andrea Solari, architects such as Bramante and Amadeo, sculptors such as Gian Cristoforo Romano, Cristoforo Solari and the Caradosso, humanists such as Baldassarre Castiglione, musicians and luthiers such as Franchino Gaffurio, Lorenzo Gusnasco, Jacopo di San Secondo, Antonio Testagrossa, as well as many of the most famous singers and dancers of the time.

At her death, as Vincenzo Calmeta wrote, "everything went to ruin and precipice, and from happy heaven to dark hell the court was converted, so that each virtuous was forced to take another path". Thus began the slow diaspora of Milanese poets, artists and writers, forced, especially after the definitive fall of the Moro, to seek their fortune elsewhere.

Portraits 

There are many portraits of Beatrice that have come down to us, both contemporary and posthumous. Most of these are of certain identification, either because they bear the name next to it or because of the distinctive features of Beatrice, such as the coazzone.

Famous portraits 
The most famous remain the bust made by Gian Cristoforo Romano, the funeral monument of Cristoforo Solari and the Sforza Altarpiece. However, Malaguzzi Valeri notes that like Solari did not bother to reproduce the true traits of Beatrice, having to the funeral statue be placed at the top of a monument and therefore seen from below and from afar, so the unknown and coarse painter of the Sforza Altarpiece altered the physiognomy of Beatrice compared to the refined original drawings of Ambrogio de Predis, hardening the features of the face to make it almost unrecognizable: "he preferred to take care of the accessories of the dress with infinite monotony, so that the duchess, more than a living person, appears a doll too adorned".

Lesser known 

 The portrait of her as a child made by Cosmè Tura was lost in the last century.
 From Leonardo it had been "divinely" portrayed, as Vasari writes, on the fresco of the Crucifixion by Donato Montorfano in the refectory of Santa Maria delle Grazie, however the artist's dry technique deteriorated in such a way as to be barely distinguishable today.
 It is carved, together with the other duchesses of Milan, in the Portale del Lavabo of the Certosa di Pavia and in a bas-relief at the Castello Sforzesco.

Uncertain identification 

 The drawing preserved in the Uffizi with the number 209, executed in lapis and watercolor but hard retouched a little everywhere by a hand of the sixteenth century, was identified by Father Sebastiano Resta (17th century) as a portrait of Beatrice d'Este and attributed to Leonardo da Vinci. Karl Morgenstern (1813) and other critics noted similarities with the Belle Ferronnière, as did Dalli Regoli (1985), who considered the drawing a copy from a lost original by Leonardo and added a certain resemblance to the bust of the Louvre. Lionello Venturi (1925) refused Leonardo's attribution and instead proposed the name of Boccaccio Boccaccino.
 The Rothschild Lady or Portrait of a Young Woman in Profile, from private collection, considered the work of the circle of Leonardo da Vinci, and precisely of Bernardino de' Conti.
 Portrait of a Young Woman in Profile by Ambrogio de Predis
 Another Portrait of a Young Woman, from the circle of Leonardo da Vinci.
 The portrait cataloged at the Uffizi as Portrait of Barbara Pallavicino by Alessandro Araldi, which, in addition to the best known elements, shows above all a pearl necklace with pendant that fully corresponds to the description made by duchess Eleonora on the gift sent by Ludovico to the future bride in 1490.
 She is also one of the possible candidates for identification with the so-called La Belle Ferronnière by Leonardo da Vinci.

Comparisons

Posthumous portraits 

 Immediately after his death, Ludovico had a head minted with his own effigy on one side and his wife's on the other. It is one of the first examples of coinage of this type, a testimony of great love and admiration for his wife. 
 At the beginning of the sixteenth century it was depicted by Bernardino Luini, together with the other members of the Sforza family, in one of the lunettes of the Palazzo degli Atellani in Milan, today in the museums of the Castello Sforzesco. On the façade of the same building, in the eighteenth century, was carved by Pompeo Marchesi a medallion depicting it.
 The face of the two sisters, Beatrice and Isabella, has been recognized in the two spectators who, tenderly embraced, are fascinated by the fresco by Benvenuto Tisi da Garofalo in the ceiling of the Sala del Tesoro of Palazzo Costabili in Ferrara. Since it dates back to the years 1503–1506, it would constitute a tribute of the Este to the now deceased joint.

Miniatures 

 The most famous miniature, the work of Giovanni Pietro Birago, is contained in the donation diploma of 28 January 1494, now preserved at the British Library in London, with which her husband enfeoffed her of numerous lands. 
 There was a certain similarity between the physiognomy of Beatrice and that "a bit impertinent" of the Laura of Antonio Grifo's Canzoniere Marciano. Ludovico and Beatrice are undoubtedly the couple who, in the Canzoniere queriniano illuminated by Grifo, at folio 119 r. acts as a guide to the others. It may have been depicted, again by Grifo, also in a letter cap illuminated at folio 182 v. of the incunabulum of the Divine Comedy preserved at the House of Dante in Rome.
 Another of her miniatures can be found in the Arcimboldi Missal of the Chapter Library of the Duomo of Milan, in the scene of the ducal investiture of her husband.

More recently she has been honored along with her court in works by painters such as Giambattista Gigola (1816-1820), Giuseppe Diotti (1823), Francesco Gonin (1845), Francesco Podesti (1846), Cherubino Cornienti (1840 and 1858), Eleanor Fortescue-Brickdale (1920), and individually in Domenico Mingione's Portrait of Beatrice d'Este (2021), which faithfully reproduces Leonardo da Vinci's charcoal drawing.

Issue 

 Ercole Massimiliano, (1493–1530), count of Pavia, duke of Milan 1513 – 1515;
 Sforza Francesco, (1495–1535), Prince of Rossano and Count of Borrello 1497 – 1498, Count of Pavia and Duke of Milan 1521 – 1524 married in 1533 to Christina of Denmark (1522–1590), daughter of King Christian II of Denmark.
 The third son was born dead and, not having been baptized, could not be placed with his mother in the tomb. Ludovico, heartbroken, therefore had him buried above the door of the cloister of Santa Maria delle Grazie with this Latin epitaph: "O unhappy childbirth! I lost my life before I was born, and more unhappy, by dying I took the life of my mother and the father deprived his wife. In so much adverse fate, this alone can be of comfort to me, that divine parents bore me, Ludovico and Beatrice dukes of Milan. 1497, January 2".

Cultural influence

Literature

Contemporary poets 

Gaspare Visconti composed a songbook for her; among the poems contained therein, one introduced by the column "for the death of the Duchess and for the peril where this homeland is placed" already shows the awareness of the next ruin of the state caused by the despair of the Moro for the loss of his wife: "and my homeland gives me much fright | that in him is sustained, so that every building | ruin, if the foundation is lacking".

Serafino Aquilano wrote four sonnets in his death, as well as other poets, including Niccolò da Correggio and Cornelio Balbo. Michele Marullo composed an Epitaphium Beatricis Estensis.

Later writers 
Beatrice appears as the protagonist or character in various literary works:

Tragedies 
 The death of Ludovico Sforza known as the Moor, tragedy of Pietro Ferrari (1791).
 Lodovico Sforza known as il Moro, tragedy by Giovanni Battista Niccolini (1833).

Novels 
 Lodovico il Moro, by Giovanni Campiglio (1837).
Beatrice or La corte di Lodovico il Moro by Ignazio Cantù (1838)
 Leonardo – the Resurrection of the Gods, by Dmitry Mereskovsky (1901).
 La città ardente – novel by Lodovico il Moro, by Dino Bonardi (1933).
 The Second Mrs. Giaconda, a novel by E. L. Konigsburg (1975).
 Duchess of Milan, by Michael Ennis (1992).
 Leonardo's Swans, by Karen Essex (2006).
 La misura dell'uomo, by Marco Malvaldi (2018).

Comics 
 Ludovico il Moro – Signore di Milano, comic strip of 2010.

Cinema 
 In the 1971 RAI miniseries The Life of Leonardo da Vinci, Beatrice is portrayed by Ottavia Piccolo.
 In the 2004 film Le grandi dame di casa d'Este by Diego Ronsisvalle she is played by Lucia Bendia.
 In the 2021 series Leonardo she is played by Miriam Dalmazio.

Music 
 The French composer Reynaldo Hahn evokes her court in his 1905 suite for winds, piano, winds, two harps, and percussion, Le Bal de Béatrice d'Este.

Culinary 

The invention of the Dolceriso del Moro, a typical dessert of Vigevano, is traditionally attributed to Beatrice herself, who would have conceived it in the spring of 1491 to please her illustrious consort. It is a kind of ricotta rice pudding, closed in a shortcrust pastry wrapper and enriched with candied fruit, pine nuts, almonds and rose water. This last ingredient served – as it seems – to induce harmony, harmony and fidelity in the couple.

Posthumous tributes 

 The Pusterla Beatrice, one of the minor gates of the city in Brera, was dedicated by Moro to the memory of his wife; 
 In modern times one of the tree-lined avenues along the ramparts of Milan, Viale Beatrice d'Este, was named after her.

Legends 
It is said that in the Sforza castle of Vigevano, and precisely in the male's wing, on hot summer nights the spirits of Beatrice and her ladies continue to animate the apartments once belonged to the duchess and the so-called "loggia delle dame", which Ludovico had built specifically for his wife.

References
Notes

Bibliografia 
 
 
 
 
 
 
 
 
 
 
 
 
 
 
 
 
 
 
 
 
 
 
 
 
 
 
 
 
 
 
 
 
 
 
 
 
 
 
 
 
 
 
 
 
  (Via Internet Archive)

External links 

1475 births
1497 deaths
Deaths in childbirth
Beatrice
Beatrice
Duchesses of Milan
15th-century Italian nobility
Renaissance women
15th-century Italian women
People from Ferrara
Daughters of monarchs